Chance Pe Dance is a 2010 Indian Hindi-language dance film starring Shahid Kapoor and Genelia D'Souza and supported by Mohnish Behl and Prince Rodde. It is directed by Ken Ghosh and produced by Ronnie Screwvala under his banner, UTV Motion Pictures. The film was released on 15 January 2010 and failed to make a mark at the box-office.
The film's working title was Yahoo and another title, Star, was also considered. Also, the film was shot halfway through with Jiah Khan as the heroine, but was later replaced by Genelia D'Souza.

Plot
 
Sameer Behl comes to Mumbai with Bollywood dreams, struggles through the day as a courier, and keeps failing in auditions for advertisements. He refuses to accept help from his father in Delhi and is thrown out of his rented flat by the landlord. One day, a movie director named Rajeev Sharma and his assistant director see Sameer dancing and call him to the office. Soon, Sameer is signed as the male lead in Sharma's film, and his friend Tina is selected as the choreographer on the same project. Homeless, Sameer sleeps in his car and works as a dance teacher in a school. Subsequently, Sameer loses the film and grows disillusioned. Tina tells him that she also quit her job as choreographer for the film because she saw how upset he was. Sameer realises Tina loves him. Tina encourages him to participate in a television talent-hunt show, the winner of which will win the same role that Sameer was to play. Sameer enters the contest and tells Tina that he loves her. Before the final round of the competition, he discovers that his father's shop in Delhi has been demolished. Sameer promises Tina that he will come back for her and returns to Delhi to help his father. After watching Sameer's performance on TV, his father convinces him to go back to Mumbai and participate in the show. Sameer is late to the final round and is initially denied entry. However, he convinces the director to give him a chance. He wins the competition and becomes the hero of the movie "Chance Pe Dance." He is shown walking the red carpet a year later with Tina.

Cast
 Shahid Kapoor as Sameer Behl (Sam), a struggling actor
 Genelia D'Souza as Tina Sharma (Choreographer)
 Mohnish Behl as Rajeev Sharma (Director)
 Prince Rodde as Bunty (Asst. Director)
 Satish Shah as Principal
 Vikas Bhalla as Gaurav Saxena
 Bikramjeet Kanwarpal as Bhutia (football coach)
 Kurush Deboo as Sameer's Landlord
 Jimmy Sharma as Purab (Model)
 Aditi Bhatia as Shanaya
 Rahul Pendkalkar 
 Manu Rishi as Tina's Friend (Special Appearance)

Production
Yahoo was the film's working title, but later, Ken Ghosh confirmed the title Chance Pe Dance in August 2009. Star was also considered, in the initial stages, but the makers rejected it as a film was released in early 2008 starring Kunal Khemu was titled Superstar.

Katrina Kaif was rumoured to be Shahid's co-star but the makers eventually chose Jiah Khan. She shot for the film but was asked to leave halfway through. She was replaced by Genelia D'Souza who shot her scenes in a whirlwind schedule. Kapoor said that he had no hand in the replacement of Khan.
Chance Pe Dance is loosely based on Shahid Kapoor and D'Souza's lives as it was mentioned on Tere Mere Beach Mein, a show hosted by Farah Khan, that they were both given a second chance in life.

Soundtrack

The film's soundtrack was composed by Pritam, Adnan Sami, Sandeep Shirodkar and Ken Ghosh.

Track listing

References

External links
 
 
 UTV Motion Pictures – Chance Pe Dance UTV PICTURES REVIEW

2010 films
2010s Hindi-language films
2010 romantic comedy-drama films
Indian romantic comedy-drama films
Films featuring songs by Pritam
UTV Motion Pictures films
2010 comedy films
2010 drama films
Indian dance films
2010s dance films